Warwick Avenue may refer to:

 Warwick Avenue, London, residential avenue in London
 Warwick Avenue tube station, a London Underground station on the Bakerloo line located on the avenue
 "Warwick Avenue" (song), a 2008 single by Duffy